Nationality words link to articles with information on the nation's poetry or literature (for instance, Irish or France).

Events

 January 19 – Liz Lochhead becomes the second Scots Makar, the official national poet of Scotland.
 April 4 – Canadian poet Christian Bök announces a significant break-through in his 9-year project to engineer "a life-form so that it becomes not only a durable archive for storing a poem, but also an operant machine for writing a poem". On April 3, Bök said that he 
 June 12 – A poet and student, Ayat al-Ghermezi of Bahrain, is sentenced to a year in prison as part of that kingdom's crackdown on Shiite protesters calling for greater rights. Ayat was arrested on March 30 for reciting a poem critical of the government and cursing the current prime minister, Khalifa ibn Salman Al Khalifa, during the Bahraini uprising in Pearl Square, the main gathering place for demonstrators, in February 2011.
 August 9 – Announcement that Philip Levine has been named Poet Laureate Consultant in Poetry to the Library of Congress (United States Poet Laureate).
 October 6 – Swedish poet Tomas Tranströmer wins the 2011 Nobel Prize in Literature
 November 9 – The former United States Poet Laureate, Robert Hass, was participating in an Occupy movement demonstration at UC Berkeley called Occupy Cal, when he was hit in the ribs by a police officer wielding a baton. The incident occurred after his wife, poet Brenda Hillman, was shoved to the ground by a police officer, and Hass had tried to help her. He wrote about their experience in a November 19, 2011, The New York Times opinion piece entitled "Poet-Bashing Police." Also, poet Geoffrey G. O'Brien suffered broken ribs at the same demonstration.
 November 11 – Politician, academic and poet Michael D. Higgins takes office as President of Ireland.
 December 6 – A memorial to Ted Hughes is unveiled in Poets' Corner of Westminster Abbey by Seamus Heaney.
 December 7 – Two British poets, Alice Oswald and John Kinsella, have withdrawn from this year's T. S. Eliot Prize in protest over the prize's sponsorship by an investment company called Arum who focus on hedge funds.

Works published in English

Australia

Canada
Michael Boughn, Cosmographia: A Post-Lucretian Faux Micro-Epic
Kate Eichhorn, Fieldnotes, A Forensic
Phil Hall, Killdeer
Garry Thomas Morse, Discovery Passages
Susan Musgrave, Origami Dove

India, in English
Vivek Narayanan, Universal Beach, 80 pages,  (SPD, dist.),

Ireland

New Zealand
 Airini Beautrais Western Line, Victoria University Press

Poets in Best New Zealand Poems
Poems from these 25 poets were selected by Chris Price for Best New Zealand Poems 2010, published online this year:

 Fleur Adcock
 Hinemoana Baker
 Emma Barnes
 Sarah Jane Barnett
 Miro Bilbrough

 Jenny Bornholdt
 James Brown
 Kate Camp
 Geoff Cochrane
 Jennifer Compton

 David Eggleton
 Cliff Fell
 John Gallas
 Anna Jackson
 Lynn Jenner

 Anne Kennedy
 Anna Livesey
 Cilla McQueen
 David Mitchell
 Bill Nelson

 John Newton
 Gregory O'Brien
 Kerrin P Sharpe
 Elizabeth Smither
 Ian Wedde

South Africa 

 Iain S. Thomas, I Wrote This For You, 202 pages, Central Avenue Publishing,

United Kingdom
Hal Duncan, Songs for the Devil and Death, 172 pages, Papaverua Press, 
Salena Godden, Under The Pier, Nasty Little Press
Ralph Pordzik, Pretending to See Elephants, 58 pages, Lulu Press, 
William Walker (age 97), The Poetry of Flt Lt William Walker AE, The Battle of Britain Memorial Trust
Eoghan Walls, The Salt Harvest, 64 pages, Seren Books, 
Carol Watts, Occasionals, Reality Street, 88 pp.,

Anthologies in the United Kingdom
Being Human, edited by Neil Astley
New Poetries V, edited by Michael Schmidt with Eleanor Crawforth, 264 pages, Carcanet Press,

United States
Seth Abramson, Northerners, 72 pages, New Issues Press, 
Ammiel Alcalay, “neither wit nor gold” (from them), 88 pp., Ugly Duckling Presse, 
Will Alexander, Compression & Purity, 100 pp., City Lights, 
Rae Armantrout, Money Shot, 80 pages, Wesleyan University Press, 
Morris Berman, Counting Blessings, 44 pages, Cervena Barva Press, 
Ernesto Cardenal, The Origin of the Species and Other Poems, translated & introduced by John Lyons, foreword by Anne Waldman, 168 pp., Texas Tech University Press, 
Billy Collins, Horoscopes for the Dead, 128 pages, Random House, 
William Corbett, The Whalen Poem, 64 pages, Hanging Loose Press, 
Joshua Corey, Severance Songs, 84 pages, Tupelo Press, 978-1-932195-92-7
Forrest Gander, Core Samples from the World, 96 pages, New Directions, 
Eloise Greenfield, The Great Migration: Journey to the North, 32 pages, Amistad, 
Jane Hirshfield, Come, Thief, 108 pages, Knopf, 
Harmony Holiday, Negro League Baseball, 104 pages, Fence Books, 
Susan Howe, That This, 112 pages, New Directions, 
David Meltzer, When I Was A Poet, 150 pages, City Lights, 
Anna Moschovakis, You and Three Others Are Approaching a Lake, 132 pages, Coffee House Press, 
Alice Notley, Culture of One, 160 pages, Penguin, 
Edward Nudelman, What Looks Like an Elephant, 116 pp., Lummox Press, 
Ovid, Love Poems, Letters and Remedies of Ovid, transl. by David R. Slavitt; introd. by Michael Dirda, 384 pp., Harvard University Press, 
Michael Palmer, Thread, 112 pages, New Directions, 
Ruben Quesada, Next Extinct Mammal, 62 pages, Greenhouse Review Press, 
Matthew Rohrer, Destroyer and Preserver, 96 pages, Wave, 
Rabindranath Tagore, The Essential Tagore, ed. by Fakrul Alam & Radha Chakravarty, 864 pp., Belknap-Harvard, 
Tyrone Williams, Pink Tie, Hooke Press,
Elizabeth Willis, Address, 80 pages, Wesleyan, 
Dean Young, Fall Higher, Copper Canyon Press,

Anthologies in the United States
Tyler Chadwick (ed.);  – Fire in the Pasture: 21st Century Mormon Poets, 546 pages. Peculiar Pages, .
Kenneth Goldsmith (ed.); Craig Dworkin (ed.) – Against Expression: An Anthology of Conceptual Writing, 656 pages. Northwestern University Press, 
Sarah Palin; Michael Solomon (ed.) – I Hope Like Heck, 64 pages. Byliner,

Criticism, scholarship and biography in the United States
Charles Bernstein, Attack of the Difficult Poems: Essays and Inventions, 296 pages, University of Chicago Press, 
Robert Duncan, The H.D. Book, 696 pages, University of California Press, 
Oren Izenberg, Being Numerous: Poetry and the Ground of Social Life, 272 pages, Princeton University Press, 
Christopher Nealon, The Matter of Capital: Poetry and Crisis in the American Century, 202 pages, Harvard University Press,

Poets in The Best American Poetry 2011
These poets appeared in The Best American Poetry 2011. David Lehman, general editor, and Kevin Young, guest editor (who selected the poetry):

Elizabeth Alexander
Sherman Alexie
Rae Armantrout
John Ashbery
Julianna Baggot
Erin Belieu
Cara Benson
Jaswinder Bolina
Catherine Bowman
Turner Cassidy
Michael Cerelli
Billy Collins
Olena Kalytiak Davis

Matthew Dickman
Michael Dickman
Denise Duhamel
Cornelius Eady
Jill Alexander Essbaum
Alan Feldman
Farrah Field
Carolyn Forche
Beckian Fritz Goldberg
Benjamin S. Grossberg
Jennifer Grotz
Robert Hass
Terrance Hayes

K.A. Hays
Bob Hicok
Jane Hirshfield
Paul Hoover
Andrew Hudgins
Major Jackson
Allison Joseph
L. S. Klatt
Jennifer L. Knox
Yusef Komunyakaa
James Longenbach
Bridget Lowe
Maurice Manning
 
Morton Marcus
Jill McDonough
Erika Meitner
Paul Muldoon
Jude Nutter
Jeni Olin
Eric Pankey
Alan Michael Parker
Catherine Pierce
Robert Pinsky
Katha Pollitt
D. A. Powell
Gretchen Steele Pratt
James Richardson

Anne Marie Rooney
Mary Ruefle
Mary Jo Salter
James Schuyler
Charles Simic
Matthew Buckly Smith
Patricia Smith
David St. John
Gerald Stern
Bianca Stone
Mark Strand
Mary Jo Thompson
Natasha Trethewey

Lee Upton
David Wagoner
Rosanna Warren
Rachel Wetzsteon
Richard Wilbur
C. K. Williams
David Wojahn
Charles Wright
Stephen Yenser

Works published in other languages

Denmark

France

Germany
 Nora Bossong, Sommer vor den Mauern: Gedichte, 96 pages, Hanser, 
 Tom Bresemann, Berliner Fenster: Gedichte, 96 pages, Bloomsbury, 
 Crauss., LAKRITZVERGIFTUNG. juicy transversions: Gedichte, 180 pages, Verlagshaus J. Frank, 
 Dietmar Dath, Gott ruft zurück: Gedichte, 60 pages, Connewitzer Verlagsbuchhandlung, 
 Synke Köhler, waldoffen: Gedichte, 76 pages, Lyrikedition 2000, 
 Alexander Gumz, ausrücken mit modellen: Gedichte, 88 pages, kookbooks, 
 Daniela Seel, ich kann diese stelle nicht wiederfinden: Gedichte, 64 pages, kookbooks, 
 Lutz Steinbrück, Blickdicht: Gedichte, 76 pages, Verlagshaus J. Frank, 
 Antony Theodore, Das Lieds meines Tanzes und der Tanz meiner Traume, 92 pages, Ventura Verlaghaus, 
 Mathias Traxler, You’re welcome: Gedichte/ Aufzeichnungen, 127 pages, kookbooks, 
 Mikael Vogel, Massenhaft Tiere: Gedichte, 100 pages, Verlagshaus J. Frank, 
 Florian Voß, Datenschatten Datenströme Staub: Gedichte, 80 pages, Verlagshaus J. Frank, 
 Matthew Zapruder, Glühend: Gedichte, a bilingual English/German edition; translated into German by Ron Winkler, 145 pages, Luxbooks, 
 Judith Zander, oder tau: Gedichte, 100 pages, dtv,

Ireland
 Seán Ó Ríordáin, Na Dánta (Poems)

Poland
 Leszek Engelking, Muzeum dzieciństwa (Museum of Childhood, WBPiCAK) 
 Julia Hartwig, Gorzkie żale (Lenten Psalms, Wydawnictwo a5)

Other languages
Bengali

 Rahman Henry, Sorrow and some other happiness. (Dukkho O Aro Kichu Ananda); Bhashachitra, Dhaka, Bangladesh. , Bengali poetry
 Chandan Chowdhury, Sculpture of Crow. (kaker vascorjo); Ittadi grantho prakash, Dhaka, Bangladesh, Bengali poetry

Ukrainian

 Les Wicks, Shadows of the Read (Krok)
 "AU/UA: Contemporary Poetry of Ukraine and Australia" (Krok) Meuse Press

Urdu
 Mehr Lal Soni Zia Fatehabadi, Meri Tasveer ("My Portrait") (GBD Books, New Delhi), Urdu poetry

Awards and honors by country

Australia awards and honors

Canada awards and honors
 Archibald Lampman Award: Paul Tyler, A Short History of Forgetting
 Atlantic Poetry Prize: John Steffler, Lookout
 2011 Governor General's Awards: Phil Hall, Killdeer (English); Louise Dupré, Plus haut que les flammes (French)
 Griffin Poetry Prize:
Canadian: Dionne Brand, Ossuaries
International, in the English Language: Gjertrud Schnackenberg, Heavenly Questions
Lifetime Recognition Award: Yves Bonnefoy
 Gerald Lampert Award: Anna Swanson, The Nights Also
 Pat Lowther Award: Evelyn Lau, Living Under Plastic
 Prix Alain-Grandbois: Carole David, Manuel de poétique à l'intention des jeunes filles
 Dorothy Livesay Poetry Prize: Stephen Collis, On the Material
 Prix Émile-Nelligan: Mahigan Lepage, Relief

New Zealand awards and honors
 New Zealand Post Book Awards:
 Award for poetry: Kate Camp The Mirror of Simple Annihilated Souls, Victoria University Press
 NZSA Jessie Mackay Best First Book Award for Poetry: Lynn Jenner Dear Sweet Harry, Auckland University Press

United Kingdom awards and honors
 Cholmondeley Award: Imtiaz Dharker, Michael Haslam, Lachlan Mackinnon
 Costa Award (formerly "Whitbread Awards") for poetry:
 Shortlist:
 English Association's Fellows' Poetry Prizes:
 Eric Gregory Award (for a collection of poems by a poet under the age of 30):
 Forward Poetry Prize:
Best Collection:
Shortlist:
Best First Collection:
Shortlist:
Best Poem:
Shortlist:
 Jerwood Aldeburgh First Collection Prize for poetry:
Shortlist:
 Manchester Poetry Prize:
 National Poet of Wales:
 National Poetry Competition 2010:
 T. S. Eliot Prize (United Kingdom and Ireland):
Shortlist (announced in November 201): 2011 Short List
 The Times/Stephen Spender Prize for Poetry Translation:

United States awards and honors
 Agnes Lynch Starrett Poetry Prize: to Dore Kiesselbach for Salt Pier
 AML Award for Poetry awarded to Tyler Chadwick for editing Fire in the Pasture: Twenty-first Century Mormon Poets
 Bollingen Prize: Susan Howe – Judges: Peter Gizzi, Marjorie Perloff, Claudia Rankine
 Kate Tufts Discovery Award: Atsuro Riley for Romey's Order
 Kingsley Tufts Poetry Award: Chase Twichell for Horses Where the Answers Should Have Been
 Lenore Marshall Poetry Prize: C.D. Wright for One With Others
 National Book Award for Poetry: Nikky Finney for Head Off & Split: Poems
 National Book Critics Circle Award for Poetry: awarded to Laura Kasischke for Space, In Chains.
 The New Criterion Poetry Prize: D.H. Tracy for Janet's Cottage
 PEN Award for Poetry in Translation: Khaled Mattawa for Adonis: Selected Poems by Adonis
 Pulitzer Prize for Poetry (United States): to Kay Ryan for The Best of It: New and Selected Poems
Finalists: The Common Man by Maurice Manning and Break the Glass by Jean Valentine
 Raiziss/de Palchi Translation Award: Dominic Siracusa
 Ruth Lilly Poetry Prize : David Ferry
 Wallace Stevens Award: Yusef Komunyakaa
 Whiting Awards: Don Mee Choi, Eduardo C. Corral, Shane McCrae, Kerri Webster
 Yale Younger Series: Eduardo C. Corral – Judge: Carl Phillips

From the Poetry Society of America
 Frost Medal: Charles Simic
 Shelley Memorial Award:       –  Judges:
 Writer Magazine/Emily Dickinson Award:   – Judge:
 Lyric Poetry Award:      – Judge:
 Lucille Medwick Memorial Award:           –  Judge:                  ; finalist:
 Alice Fay Di Castagnola Award:            – Judge:                   ; finalists:
 Louise Louis/Emily F. Bourne Student Poetry Award:      –  Judge:    ; finalists:
 George Bogin Memorial Award:                  –      Judge:
 Robert H. Winner Memorial Award:            –        Judge:           ; finalists:
 Cecil Hemley Memorial Award:               –         Judge:
 Norma Farber First Book Award:              –          Judge:
 William Carlos Williams Award:           –             Judge:            ; finalists:

From the Poetry Society of Virginia Student Poetry Contest

2011 Student Poetry Contest Winners :: Category 8: Virginia Student Prize :: Judge:  Dr. Kate Simpson, Winchester, VA
1st Place –  Jake Robinson of Virginia Beach, VA for the poem "Makings of Men"
2nd Place –  Mikal Cardine of Midland, VA for the poem "Remember"
3rd Place –  Kira Tomlin of Front Royal, VA for the poem "Caught In Silence"
1st Honorable Mention –  Elliott Warren of Richmond, VA for the poem "Time Does Not Heal"
2nd Honorable Mention –  Franklin Ewing of Richmond, VA for the poem "Against Kosovel"
3rd Honorable Mention –  Andre Aganbi of Chester, VA for the poem "Classic Scene"

2011 Student Poetry Contest Winners :: Category 7: College/University :: Judge:  Bob Kelly, Newport News, VA
1st Place Ishaway Friestad of Norfolk, VA for the poem "Super Nova"
3rd Place Lauren "Wren" Brown of Springfield, VA for the poem "Spiral"

2011 Student Poetry Contest Winners :: Category 6: Grades 11 & 12 :: Judge:  Nancy Powell, Hampton, VA
1st Place Franklin Ewing of Richmond, VA for the poem "Think"
2nd Place Bridget Jamison of Vienna, VA for the poem "The Dance"
3rd Place Stephen Wood of Richmond, VA for the poem "On The Rechristening of High Fructose Corn Syrup"

2011 Student Poetry Contest Winners :: Category 5: Grades 9 & 10:: Judge:  Pete Freas, Chesapeake, VA
1st Place Hannah Wilson of Oak Park, IL for the poem “I came from a mother...”
2nd Place Hannah Srajer of Oak Park, IL for the poem "Crusade"
2nd Place Olivia O'Sullivan of Oak Park, IL for the poem “weekday drinking...”
3rd Place Natalie Richardson of Oak Park, IL for the poem “his curious fingers...”
3rd Place Yuliya Semibratova of Oak Park, IL for the poem “not red, nor white, nor blue...”
1st Honorable Mention Rory Dunn of Fredericksburg, VA for the poem "The Feeling"

2011 Student Poetry Contest Winners :: Category 4: Grades 7 & 8 :: Judge:  ijil Rainbow Hawk Giver, Norfolk, VA
1st Place Tess Hinchman of West Bath, ME for the poem "March 15"
2nd Place Sam Herter of Brunswick, ME for the poem “Fears: Age 7”
3rd Place Lilly Richardson of Whitefield, ME for the poem “Do You Remember?”
1st Honorable Mention Sophia Carbonneau of Alna, ME for the poem "This Is Just To Say"
1st Honorable Mention Sabrina Sammel of Stafford, VA for the poem "Silence"
2nd Honorable Mention Morganne Elkins of Edgecomb, ME for the poem "Don"
2nd Honorable Mention Caleb Rinderer of Newport News, VA for the poem "Country Daybreak"
3rd Honorable Mention Rex Reilly of Miami Beach, FL for the poem "Chocolate"

Deaths
Birth years link to the corresponding "[year] in poetry" article:

January 5 – Malangatana Ngwenya, age 74 (born 1936), Mozambican poet and painter
January 10 – María Elena Walsh, age 80 (born 1930), Argentine musician, poet and writer ("Manuelita la tortuga")
January 11 – Susana Chávez, age 36 (born 1974), Mexican poet and human rights activist, strangled
January 20
F. A. Nettelbeck, age 60 (born 1950), American poet
Reynolds Price, age 77 (born 1933), American novelist, occasional poet, and scholar of the work of John Milton
January 23 – Novica Tadić, age 62 (born 1949), Yugoslavian poet
January 25 – R. F. Langley, age 72 (born 1938), English poet and diarist, loosely affiliated with the Cambridge poetry scene
February 3 – Édouard Glissant, age 82 (born 1928), French-Martiniquan poet and writer
February 6 – Andrée Chedid, 90, Egyptian-born French poet and novelist
February 11 – Bo Carpelan, 84, Finnish poet and author 
February 25 – Aminath Faiza, 82, Maldivian poet and author
February 25 – Justinas Marcinkevičius, 80, Lithuanian poet and playwright
 March 2 – John Haines, 86, American poet and educator, former poet laureate of Alaska
 April 2 – Paul Violi, 66, American poet
 April 25 – Ira Cohen, 76 (born 1935), American poet, publisher, photographer and filmmaker
 May 10 – Patrick Galvin, 83 (born 1927), Irish poet and dramatist
 May 19 – William Kloefkorn, 78 (born 1933), American poet and former "Nebraska State Poet"
 May 23 – Roberto Sosa, 81 (born 1930), Honduran poet
May 25:
Edwin Honig, 91 (born 1919), American poet, critic and translator known for his English renditions of seminal works of Spanish and Portuguese literature
Yannis Varveris (born 1955), Greek poet, critic and translator
May 27 – Gil Scott-Heron, 62 (born 1949), American poet, spoken-word musician and author who helped lay the groundwork for rap by fusing minimalistic percussion, political expression and spoken-word poetry

May 29 – Da Real One, 46, American poet (Def Poetry) gunned down in North Miami
June 2 – Josephine Hart, 69 (born 1942), Irish-born British novelist and poetry promoter. As director of Haymarket Publishing, a founder of Gallery Poets and West End Poetry Hour
June 21 – Robert Kroetsch, OC, 83 (born 1927), Canadian novelist, poet and non-fiction writer
August 22 – Samuel Menashe, 85 (born 1925), American poet and the first poet to receive "The Neglected Masters Award", given by the Poetry Foundation of America, which he received in 2004
August 24 – Seyhan Erözçelik, 49 (born 1962), Turkish poet
August 26 – Susan Fromberg Schaeffer, 71 (born 1940), American novelist and poet, finalist for 1975 National Book Award in poetry for Granite Lady
September 4 – Hugh Fox, 79 (born 1932), prolific American novelist and poet, a founder of the Pushcart Prize
October 18 – Andrea Zanzotto, 90 (born 1921), Italian poet
October 27 – Allen Mandelbaum, 85 (born 1926), American poet and translator
November 10 – Ivan Martin Jirous, 67 (born 1944), Czech poet
November 19 - Ruth Stone, 96 (born 1915), American poet
November 21 – Theodore Enslin, 86 (born 1925), American poet with close ties to Cid Corman, Charles Olson, and particularly the Objectivist tradition in the U.S.
November 24 – Andrzej Mandalian, 85 (born 1926), Polish poet
December 14 – George Whitman, 98 (born 1913), heir to Sylvia Beach as proprietor of the Shakespeare and Company bookstore in Paris
December 18 – Václav Havel, 75 (born 1936) was a Czech playwright, essayist, poet, dissident and politician; best known to the public as the last president of Czechoslovakia (1989–1992) and the first President of the Czech Republic (1993–2003)
December 30 – Eleanor Ross Taylor, 91, American poet who received the 2010 Ruth Lilly Poetry Prize of $100,000 which honors poets whose "lifetime accomplishments warrant extraordinary recognition"

See also

Poetry
List of poetry awards

Notes

2010s in poetry
Poetry